This is a list of fictional countries that are set somewhere in the continent of Africa.

A
Africa: Africa is portrayed as one country in various works, typically comprising an expansive and sparsely-populated jungle or savanna.
African Confederation: Future African country that includes present-day Somalia, that is the birthplace of Geordi La Forge in Star Trek: The Next Generation 
Afrinia: African country used in World Bank training exercises 
Afromacoland: African country in the novel Chief the Honourable Minister by T. M. Aluko
Azania: African country from Evelyn Waugh's novel Black Mischief but with earlier origins in Roman histories. Azania is also a fictional country in the Marvel comics. 
Abuddin: A Middle East country in the series Tyrant
Aburĩria, Free Republic of: African country ruled by a dictator known only as the "Ruler" in the novel Wizard of the Crow by Kenyan author, Ngũgĩ wa Thiong'o.

B
Babar's Kingdom: from children's book, a country of intelligent bipedal elephants.
Bahari: from the CBS television series Scorpion, a small north African nation under the brutal rule of a dictatorship. The nation is a former Nazi German colony and there are several Nazi German military bases located in the deserts of the country.
Balaika : A fictional Central African country in the 2014 BBC Radio 4 Play "When The Laughter Stops", written by Sibusiso Mamba, co-created with Daliso Chaponda and with additional material by Ava Vidal. In the play two stand up comedians get into trouble in a country that is in the process of deciding whether homosexuality should be a capital offence.
Balic: A fictional African country featured in the Japanese anime television series Full Metal Panic! The Second Raid. 
Bangalla: from The Phantom comic strip. The Phantom's base lies in the deep woods of this central African nation.
Bapetikosweti: The "homeland" state in which the South African satirist Pieter-Dirk Uys (under the guise of his drag character, Evita Bezuidenhout) was the South African ambassador. Bapetikosweti's capital Laagerfontein was also the sight of a major Boer battle, and today contains the Lunaville Casino and most famously Blanche-Noir, the South African Embassy to the Independent Homeland of Bapetikosweti. After the democratic elections of 1994, Bapetikosweti was re-incorporated into South Africa.
Beninia: from John Brunner's Stand on Zanzibar
Birani: African nation featured in the film The Gods Must Be Crazy. Located near Namibia and Angola. Has a Banana Forest at a place called Dumgase. 
Bialya (Currently Greater Bialya): an evil nation in the show Young Justice, led by a mind controlling female by the name of Queen Bee. She is part of The Light, a group of supervillains. 
Bocamo: a gold-producing West African state from the Mission: Impossible TV episode "Kitara". Renowned as a particularly brutal practitioner of apartheid.
Bonande: West African country in the film La Nuit de la vérité
Bongo Congo: African kingdom in animated cartoon series King Leonardo and His Short Subjects
Bora-Baru Fictional country located inside Tanzania, having a coast. From the Marvel Comics.
Botswanga: African country in the film Le crocodile du Botswanga with its king 
Bulmeria: an African country mentioned in the webcomic, It's Walky!
Bulungi: A country located south of Côte d'Ivoire and southeast of Liberia featured in an article by satirical news group The Onion. In the article, the United States' "ambassador" to Bulungi is accused of making the country up. Bulungi's capital city is Yabba-Dabba.
Buranda: African country in the BBC comedy series Yes Minister, formerly known as "British Equatorial Africa"
Burunda: Fictional country located in Southern Africa. From the Marvel comics, it is not to be confused with Burundi.
Butua: African country of cannibals in the novel Aline and Valcour by the Marquis de Sade.

C
Carbombya: country mentioned in the Transformers series
Canaan: African nation bordering Wakanda from the Marvel universe. 
Claw Island: African nation occupying the island of Madagascar as portrayed in a video by The Onion about the United States sending USD $3 billion worth of aid to Andorra.

D
Darrar, Federal Republic of: A country in the Horn of Africa based on Ethiopia in the novel Borderlines by Michela Wrong.
North Darrar: A country in the Horn of Africa based on Eritrea in the novel Borderlines by Michela Wrong. The capital city is Lira. The country neighbours the Federal Republic of Darrar and has fought a war against it over a border dispute based on the Eritrean–Ethiopian War.

E
Equatorial Kundu: West African republic originally depicted on the Aaron Sorkin series The West Wing, and later on The Newsroom and IZombie (TV series).

F
Federal Republic of South Africa: A South African state mentioned in the 1991 novel Vortex, by Larry Bond and Patrick Larkin. It is the successor state to the apartheid-era "Republic of South Africa" and is established after a civil war takes place in South Africa over the fate of apartheid in the early 1990s; its capital is Johannesburg after having been moved there from Pretoria due to the latter city's negative association with the apartheid regime and the subsequent civil war.

G
Genosha: an island nation which was established as a mutant homeland in Marvel Comics
Ghalea: a small African nation whose pro-Western government is key to stability in the area, from the Mission: Impossible episode "The Money Machine"
Ghudaza: Small fictional country bordering Wakanda. From the Marvel Comics. 
Gindra: a small nation in Central Africa formerly the home of Outer Heaven in Metal Gear: Ghost Babel
Gorilla City: a city of super-intelligent gorillas in the DC Comics Universe; In 1999 it became a member of the United Nations
Gorotoland: an African republic and site of Cold War conflict in Allen Drury's novel Capable of Honor.
Great Islam Nation: a theocratic state which extends on Middle-East and Africa in the two novels Wang by French author Pierre Bordage.
Guadec: African country in an episode of Spooks. Led by reformist President Manu Baffong.
Gwinalia: fictional African country in the PBS show Chocolate.

H
Halwan: Fictional African nation bordering Algeria and Libya. Featured in the Marvel comics.

I
Imaya: Small Central African country located in between Nigeria and Niger. Featured in the Marvel Comics.
Interzone: a fictionalized version of Tangier from William S. Burroughs' Naked Lunch
Ishmaelia: a fictional African country from the novel Scoop by Evelyn Waugh

K
Kalubya: North African country corresponding to the location of Libya in Operation Thunderbolt arcade game
Kalya: West African country in the novel The Zinzin Road by Fletcher Knebel. Capital city: Ft. Paul.
Kamanga: Southern African country between Namibia and Mozambique in the novel Tenth Man Down by Chris Ryan. Ruled from the poverty-stricken capital of Mulongwe, Kamanga is the very model of post-colonial corruption, nepotism, and greed. The territory, once a British possession, is now suffering from an AIDS epidemic, while poaching goes unchecked during a brutal civil war. Uranium, diamonds, and bauxite are key resources, although they remain in the hands of the European-descended elite. Kamanga uses the Kwacha as its national currency. This "Kwacha" is a fictional currency, but it has the same name as the Malawian kwacha and the Zambian kwacha.
Kambawe: location of Tom Stoppard's 1978 play Night and Day
Kambezi: Southern African country occurring in several MacGyver episodes, located somewhere near Zimbabwe and home to a population of black rhinos, a protected species approaching rapid extinction thanks to South African poachers. Kambezi is also in fact a military dictatorship, and relies heavily on the smuggling of dagga. Kambezi was later used in season 3 of Blindspot, but was a Central African monarchy at war with its neighbor and seeking control of a pipeline.
Kangan: African nation in the novel Anthills of the Savannah (1984) by Chinua Achebe
Katanga: African country, neighboring Sierra Leone, in Frederick Forsyth's The Dogs of War (1974)
Kenyopia: belligerent African nation in Totally Spies! TV series attempting to conquer its fictional neighbor Lyrobia (see below) with its King Milanalwayskumar
Kharun: fictional country that Prime Minister Birgitte Nyborg visits in the second season of Borgen
Khokarsa: ancient African empire that serves as the primary setting for Philip José Farmer's Khokarsa series
Kijuju: African country in Resident Evil 5, which is subject to viral experimentation
Kinjanja: African country in the 1994 film A Good Man in Africa, starring Sean Connery
Kivukiland: African kingdom in the 2001 South African comedy movie Mr Bones by Leon Schuster, starring Leon Schuster
Kôr: African country in the novel She by H. Rider Haggard
Kukuanaland: African country in the novel King Solomon's Mines (1885) by H. Rider Haggard
Kush: African country from John Updike's 1978 novel The Coup

L
Ligeria: African home of the agent Benjamin N’udu in the Canadian TV series InSecurity.
Logosia: African country from the Mission: Impossible TV episode "The Crane".
Lombuanda: an independent white-supremacist African country on the Gulf of Guinea in the Mission: Impossible episode "The Diamond". Underdeveloped and densely forested, Lombuanda is ruled by French-speaking settlers who keep two million black citizens starved and without 'schools, hospitals, or any voice in government'. The title of prime minister is held by Hendrik Durvard, a despotic white Lombuandan who plans to use a 27,000-carat diamond to finance his seizure of tribal reserves.
Lyrobia: African nation, ruled by Queen Tassara, in French/Canadian animated TV series Totally Spies! containing desert and rain forest environments, with an Arabic-inspired culture.
Lamumba: A small, prospering county, published in DC Comics, and was first seen in Doom Patrol #100, "The Fantastic Origin Of The Beast Boy".

M
Malagawi: African country in le Professionnel, film by Georges Lautner starring Jean-Paul Belmondo.
Matobo: a state based on Zimbabwe, from the 2005 film The Interpreter. "Matobo" is also used briefly in 24: Redemption in a scene where an international videoconference takes place and on 24 (season 7), where Ule Matobo (fictional) is a former president of Sangala, the fiction African nation. The nation was also used as the setting for the Swedish film Morgan Pålsson - världsreporter, but spelled with an accent, Matóbo.
Maurania: African country in Paradise video game.
Mbangawi: African country located between Tanzania and Kenya. Featured in the Marvel Comics.
Mittelafrika: A German colony in the Kaiserreich mod for Hearts of Iron IV.
Mohannda: Fictional country bordering Wakanda and Zwartheid. From the Marvel Comics. 
Moloni Republic: Southern African country from the video game Metal Gear Acid.
Mombaka: an African country featured in the films Red Scorpion and Jagga Jasoos.
Mumbambu: African nation occupying the Central and East region as portrayed in a video by The Onion about the United States sending USD $3 billion worth of aid to Andorra as it was believed to be south of Mumbambu in Africa, not Europe.
Murkatesh: Country bordering Algeria and Nigeria. From the Marvel Comics.

N
Nadua: Fictional country bordered by Namibia all around. From the Marvel Comics.
Nagonia: African country in Yulian Semyonov's spy novel TASS Is Authorized to Announce..., and in the 1984 film of the same title
Nambabwe: a parody of Namibia (formerly South West Africa) during the time of its UN-supervised independence from South Africa. A spoof of the transition by the UN peace-keeping forces was the subject of a 1990 comedy film by Leon Schuster, Oh Shucks...Here Comes UNTAG.
Nambia: African country usually said as a mispronunciation of Namibia erroneously stated likely due to the prevalence of nations with similar name such as Gambia and Zambia.
Nambutu: a fictional African nation in the 2006 film Casino Royale. 
Naruba: a fictional West African country in Designated Survivor. It is located in between Mali, Niger, Nigeria, Benin and Burkina Faso. Its capital city is Soji. It is mentioned to be one of the poorest nations on the planet, with conflicts arising from warlords such as Atsu Kalame. 
Narubu: fictional country from Army Wives.
Narobia: Fictional country from the Marvel comics. Small country located near Ethiopia and Wakanda. 
Natumbe: African country from Dynasty TV series
Nayak: imaginary West African country in the 2004 film La Nuit de la vérité (Night of Truth)
Neranga: "new African country" featured in a Rumpole story called "Rumpole and the Golden Thread" by John Mortimer
New Zanzibar: featured in The Simpsons episode "Simpson Safari", this country only existed for a few moments between Tanzania and Pepsi Presents New Zanzibar.
Nexdoria: featured in Coming 2 America as a rival, adjacent country to Zamunda.
Ng'ombwana: African country depicted in the 1974 novel Black As He's Painted by Ngaio Marsh
Ngombia: West African country featured in the 1963 Tom Swift Jr. novel Tom Swift and His Repelatron Skyway. 
Niberia: African country in the 2009 film The International
Nibia: African country in the 1995 film Ace Ventura: When Nature Calls
Niganda: Fictional country bordering Wakanda. From the Marvel Comics, it is also called Niganoa. 
Numbani: West African city-state bordering Nigeria in the video game Overwatch
Nyala: African country depicted in the novel Juggernaut by Desmond Bagley

O
Odan: a Central African republic at war with its neighbor and seeking control of a pipeline in season 3 of Blindspot.
Opar: located deep in the jungles of Africa. Portrayed as a lost colony of Atlantis in Edgar Rice Burroughs's series of Tarzan novels.
Orïsha: a West Africa country based on Nigeria in the fantasy novel Children of Blood and Bone and its sequel by Tomi Adeyemi.
Outer Heaven: fortified microstate founded by a "legendary mercenary" 200 km north of the fictional Galzburg, South Africa

P
Pan-Africa: featured in the Judge Dredd comic book series.
Pan African Union: Future federal Sub-Saharan superstate in the science fiction wargame Full Thrust
Pepsi Presents New Zanzibar: featured in The Simpsons episode "Simpson Safari", this country came into being after civil war in Tanzania created the country New Zanzibar, which moments later was purchased by Pepsi.
Podoso: a fictional Central African country mentioned in the Turkish television series Valley of the Wolves.
Pride Lands: a fictional East African country where lions rule the kingdom. Pride Rock, a colossal rock formation, serves as the residence of the king and his pride, based on the real-life Tanzania in Disney's The Lion King.

R
Republic of West Africa: This country is highlighted in the episode 6 of season 1 of Madam Secretary, "The Call" when the country's government intends to carry out sad lead noised by King of sad lead noised Adam. It is also found in several kinds of scam spams.
Republic Of Alabanda: This country is located in fiction Kenya led by Tiger Fang General and Governor Krima in 1964 Kokusai Himitsu Keisatsu second installment Trap of Suicide Kilometer.
Rudyarda: Small African nation north of Wakanda. Featured in the Marvel Comics.

S
Sahelise Republic: African country mentioned in The West Wing, episode "In This White House"
Shakobi: African monarchy from That's So Raven TV series, episode "The Royal Treatment"
Samgola: a parody of Angola bordering Nambabwe in Leon Schuster's film Oh Schucks...Here Comes UNTAG.
Sangala: A nation from 24: Redemption and 24 (season 7) where Jack Bauer comes to after running away from his life. A coup d'état takes place, with rebels using brainwashed children as soldiers. The nation is later invaded by the US in season 7.
Seanfrika: A country from the movie Sean Banan inuti Seanfrika founded by the Iranian-Swedish comedian Sean Banan to escape the cold Swedish winters.
Sonzola: an African republic mentioned in the novels of Christopher Brookmyre
Sotho: a kingdom in Africa mentioned in a 1997 episode of the German TV series Küstenwache (note: the name and the royalist form of government seem to refer to the real existing Kingdom of Lesotho – however, in the episode, the King of Sotho comes to Germany to order ships for his coastguard, which would not make any sense for the real Lesotho, since the country is landlocked).
Suaoriland: a country in East Africa briefly mentioned in Donna Tartt's novel The Secret History.

T
Talgalla: A fictional African country featured in Dave Brubeck's jazz musical The Real Ambassadors.
Tanzaberia: An African country featured in the Disney Channel show K.C. Undercover.
Transvalia: not actually a state in its own right, but rather a parody of Orania. Leon Schuster made a comedy film called Sweet 'n Short (1991), which was a parody of life in the New South Africa. The film was made in 1990 shortly after Nelson Mandela was released from prison - many of the fictional events portrayed therein actually came to pass in post-apartheid South Africa.
Trucial Abysmia: East African country in the G.I. Joe comics.

U
Ujanka: Fictional country located near Wakanda and Lake Turkana. From the Marvel comics.
Umbazi: Country from the Marvel comics. Borders Angola and the Democratic Republic of the Congo
Umbutu, National Republic of: A post invasion nation in Independence Day: Resurgence that during the 1996 war was the one place where the Harvesters landed. 
United Mitanni Commonwealth: A fictional African country in Lee Correy's science fiction novel Manna.
United States of Southern Africa (USSA): A country born out of the Republic of South Africa in 2061: Odyssey Three. Apartheid in South Africa ends some time in the late 2010s or early 2020s, followed by a mass exodus of Afrikaners and capital flight out of the country towards Europe. A terrorist insurgency of Afrikaners called "The Bund" conducts attacks against the USSA.
United States of Southern Africa: A country born out of the Republic of South Africa in World War Z
Upper Gorm: Fictional African country in the 1980 comedy film First Family.
UAC: An unnamed African country depicted in the video game Far Cry 2, can also be presumed to be named Seko.

W
Wadiya: Country ruled by the protagonist in the 2012 film The Dictator. Located by the Red Sea.
Wakanda: small African nation featured in the Marvel Comics series The Avengers. The nation is ruled by King T'Challa, also known as the super hero Black Panther. 
West Angola: a fictional African country referred to in Scandal.
West African Union: a fictional merger of Liberia and Sierra Leone in Seafighter a 1999 novel by James H. Cobb. Ruled by Premier-General Obe Belewa. 
West Monrassa: Central African country in an episode of Spooks. Run by President Gabriel Sakoa, a corrupt leader planning a genocide against the people in the north of the country.

Z
 Zambakia: An African country featured in the Disney Channel show K.C. Undercover.
Zambawi: African country from Patrick Neate's novel Musungu Jim and the Great Chief Tuloko (2000)
Zambezi: African monarchy in King Ralph. It is a new state rich with mineral resources and becomes a trade partner with the UK.
Zambesi: Zambesi is a country in DC Comics

Zamunda: African monarchy from the Eddie Murphy film Coming to America (1988) and its sequel Coming 2 America (2021)
Zangaro: West African country in the novel The Dogs of War (1974)
Zanj: African country from John Updike's novel The Coup (1978)
Zanzarim: Fictional West African nation in William Boyd's James Bond novel Solo
Zarakal: East African country from Michael Bishop's novel No Enemy But Time (1982)
Zembala: African country in the 1978 film The Wild Geese
Zinariya: an African country famous for its copper mines, ruled by a dictator, General Bindiga, in A. N. Wilson's My Name Is Legion (2004)
Zulabwe: an African country where the squad from popular TV serial, The A-Team (by Stephen J. Cannell and Frank Lupo (1983) found themselves in one of the episodes.
Zu-Vendis: African country in H. Rider Haggard's 1887 book Allan Quatermain containing a lost white race.
Zwartheid: Fictional country located near Wakanda from the Marvel Comics.

References

External links

Africa
Africa in fiction